Tan Tin Wee (born 1962) is a Singaporean bioinformatician and university lecturer. He is an associate professor at the Department of Biochemistry at the National University of Singapore and Chief Executive of the National Supercomputing Center (NSCC) Singapore. As the inventor and founder of multilingual internationalized domain names (IDN) and a pioneer of the Internet, he was inducted into the Internet Society of 2012 along with the founding fathers of the Internet in the first Internet Hall of Fame. He  is well known in Singapore and the region for his work on propagating and developing the Internet.

Education 
Tan studied Biochemistry at the University of Cambridge from 1982 to 1985, after which he received the Master of Science in Molecular Biology and Biotechnology at University College London. He followed it up with a PhD in molecular biology on vaccines at University of Edinburgh in 1990.

Biography 
Tan returned to Singapore in 1990 to develop TechNet, Singapore's first network for a nationwide research community. In 1994, he and his Chinese language team wrote a program that matches the code for each character and then merged the images into one larger image. This program was also extended to the Tamil language. Tan was responsible for several key internet milestones, including the first Gopher Server, the Singapore InfoWeb and the forerunner of the present National Web Homepage. Under his leadership, the Internet Research and Development Unit (IRDU), developed the first regional Java website and the first functional multilingual domain name system (iDNS). 

In addition to his NUS position, Tan is also chair of the agency for the Computational Resource Center for Science, Technology and Research, which is equipping Singapore with supercomputing capabilities for the twenty-first century. Tan also pioneered the use of new technologies for online computer communication. 

In November 2014, his team, along with Australian, Japanese and US universities, as well as industry partners Obsidian Strategics and Tata Communications, demonstrated the first high-speed InfiniBand connection between three continents on a platform called InfiniCortex.

In 2015, the National Supercomputing Center was set up and Tan became the Chief Executive.

Personal life 
Tan is married to Karen Seow. They have a daughter and a son.

Awards 
For his work, he received national and international recognition: the Singapore Youth Award for Excellence (1994), the Vaccine Research Trust Annual Award (1989), the Japanese Chamber of Commerce and Industry (JCCI) Education Award (1997 ), the ASEAN Achievement Award (1997) from the ASEAN Business Forum, the Life Insurance Association (LIA) Award for community work, the 7th Innovation Award of the Indian Cultural Festival (1998), the Achievement Award (1998), the gold medal of the World Congress for Medical Informatics MEDINFO'92 and he is a member of the International Who's Who of Professionals (1999) and a member of the exclusive World Technology Network (2001) as one of 450 leading scientists and entrepreneurs worldwide.

He has been featured in books such as Singapore's Scientific Pioneers as one of 25 pioneers  and the Singapore Tamils 200, a book which was released in honour of  those who contributed to the Indian community development.

He has served in the board of directors of Keppel Telecommunications and Transportation, and currently serves in the management board of Keppel Data Centre REIT listed in Singapore stock exchange.

He is also a proponent of environmentally green data centers at TED talks.

References

External links 
 NSCC MANAGEMENT – NSCC
 Singapore Campus Party Biography
 The Accidental Internet Pioneer
 Singapore's supercomputer ambitions get a timely, much-needed boost
 

1962 births
Living people
Singaporean academics
Alumni of the University of Cambridge
Alumni of University College London
Singaporean scientists
Alumni of the University of Edinburgh Medical School
Bioinformaticians